Radio JIBi is a news and education project. It includes a 24/7 radio station and a virtual school. It aims to present the latest news and scientific and intellectual education in Persian and English.

References and notes

Internet radio stations in the United States
Persian-language radio stations